Charles Henry See (October 13, 1896 – July 19, 1948), nicknamed "Chad", was a Major League Baseball outfielder. See played for the Cincinnati Reds from 1919 through 1921.

In 92 games over three seasons, See posted a .272 batting average (55-for-202) with 21 runs, 1 home run and 23 RBI.

External links

1896 births
1948 deaths
Baseball players from New York (state)
Major League Baseball outfielders
Cincinnati Reds players
People from Pleasantville, New York